Carpetweed is a common name for several plants and may refer to:

 Aizoaceae, a family of flowering plants
 Ajuga reptans, a plant
 Molluginaceae, a family of flowering plants
 Mollugo
 Mollugo verticillata
 Phyla canescens